The 2020 Production Alliance Group 300 was a NASCAR Xfinity Series race held on February 29, 2020 at Auto Club Speedway in Fontana, California. Contested over 150 laps on the  asphalt superspeedway, it was the third race of the 2020 NASCAR Xfinity Series season. Rookie driver Harrison Burton won his first ever race in the NASCAR Xfinity series.

Report

Background 
Auto Club Speedway (formerly California Speedway) is a 2 miles (3.2 km), low-banked, D-shaped oval superspeedway in Fontana, California which has hosted NASCAR racing annually since 1997. It is also used for open wheel racing events. The racetrack is located near the former locations of Ontario Motor Speedway and Riverside International Raceway. The track is owned and operated by International Speedway Corporation and is the only track owned by ISC to have naming rights sold. The speedway is served by the nearby Interstate 10 and Interstate 15 freeways as well as a Metrolink station located behind the backstretch.

Entry list 

 (R) denotes rookie driver.
 (i) denotes driver who is ineligible for series driver points.

Practice

First practice 

Final practice 

Qualifying 

Qualifying results 

 Chad Finchum, Bayley Currey, and Josh Bilicki started from the rear due to unapproved adjustments.
 Tommy Joe Martins started from the rear due to an engine change.

Race

Race results

Stage Results 
Stage One
Laps: 35

Stage Two
Laps: 35

Final Stage Results 

Laps: 80

Race statistics 

 Lead changes: 13 among 8 different drivers
 Cautions/Laps: 8 for 36
 Red flags: 0
 Time of race: 2 hours, 28 minutes, 15 seconds
 Average speed:

Media

Television 
The Production Alliance 300 was carried by FS1 in the United States. Adam Alexander, Team Penske driver Joey Logano, and Hendrick Motorsports crew chief Chad Knaus called the race from the booth, with Matt Yocum and Regan Smith covering pit road.

Radio 
The Motor Racing Network (MRN) called the race for radio, which was simulcast on SiriusXM NASCAR Radio. Dan Hubbard and Steve Post anchored the action from the booth. Kyle Rickey called the action from Turns 1 & 2 and Alex Hayden called the race through turns 3 & 4. Dillon Welch and Kim Coon provided reports from pit road.

Standings after the race 

 Drivers' Championship standings

Note: Only the first 12 positions are included for the driver standings.

References 

Production Alliance Group 300
2020 NASCAR Xfinity Series
2020 in sports in California
NASCAR races at Auto Club Speedway